A sickle is an agricultural tool.

Sickle may also refer to:

Sickle Mountain, Antarctica
Sickle Ridge, Antarctica
Sickle Nunatak, Antarctica
The Sickle, a name for part of the constellation Leo
Sickle (horse), an English thoroughbred
HMS Sickle, a Second World War Royal Navy submarine
SS-25 Sickle, NATO reporting name for the RT-2PM Topol mobile intercontinental ballistic missile
 The sickle, a fictional currency unit and silver coin in the Harry Potter novels, see Fictional universe of Harry Potter#Economy

See also
 Parapholis incurva, also known as sicklegrass, a species of grass
 Senna obtusifolia, also called sicklepod, a legume
 Dichrostachys cinerea, also known as sicklebush, a legume
 Sickel
 Sickles (disambiguation)